Unknown is a Slovenian rapper and multiple freestyle battle champion from Ljubljana, Slovenia.

Early career
Unknown first appeared on the Hip Hop Kuh'na in 2004, a compilation showcasing some of the best Slovenian rappers, composed and released by Nika records. At the time, he was only 17 years old.

Freestyle champion
Unknown gained wider national recognition, when he won Slovenian Freestyle Battle Championship in 2005. Beating Zlatko in the final, he won a record deal with RapNika, at the time a subrecord company of Nika records, releasing exclusively hip hop music. He repeated this feat in 2011 and 2015, and is the only MC, next to N'toko, to win championships consecutively and three times altogether.

Discography
2010: Rep za u žep

References

External links
http://www.discogs.com/artist/76611-Unknown-27 Unknown MC's discography

Slovenian rappers
Slovenian musicians